A witness is someone who has first-hand knowledge of something, especially a crime or dramatic event, and usually by seeing it.

Witness may also refer to:

Films
 The Witness (1969 French film), a drama film
 The Witness (1969 Hungarian film), a satirical film, also known as A tanú
 Witness (1985 film), a film directed by Peter Weir, starring Harrison Ford
 Witness (1988 film), a Malayalam film
 The Witness (1992 film), a short film starring Elijah Wood and Gary Sinise
 Witness (1995 film), a 1995 Indian film
 The Witness (2000 film), a film by James LaVeck and Jenny Stein
 Witnesses (2003 film), a Croatian film
 The Witnesses, a 2007 French film by André Téchiné
 The Witness (2012 film), a Philippine film
 The Witness (2015 Chinese film), a crime drama film
 The Witness (2015 American film), a documentary about the murder of Kitty Genovese
 The Witness (2018 film), a South Korean thriller
 Witnesses (2018 film), a historical drama by Konstantin Fam

Games
 The Witness (1983 video game), an interactive fiction computer game
 The Witness (2016 video game), an exploration-puzzle game

Literature
 Witness (autobiography), an autobiography by Whittaker Chambers
 Witness (novel), a 2001 verse novel of historical fiction by Karen Hesse
Witness: Passing the Torch of Holocaust Memory to New Generations, a 2015 book Holocaust survivors
 Witness (character), several characters by Marvel Comics

Music

Groups
 Witness (American band), an Atlanta rock band
 Witness (French band), a French rock band
 Witness (gospel group), a female gospel quartet
 Witness (UK band), an English alternative rock band
 A Witness, an English post-punk band

Albums
 Witness (Benjamin Booker album), 2017
 Witness (Blessthefall album), 2009
 Witness (Dave Douglas album), 2001
 Witness (Halo James album), 1990
 Witness (Katy Perry album), 2017
 Witness (Modern Life Is War album), 2005
 Witness (Show of Hands album), 2006
 Witness (Spooky Tooth album), 1973
 Witness (Vola album), 2021
 The Witness (Suuns album), 2021

Songs
 "The Witness", a song by members of the American rock band Tool
 "Witness", a song by Tori Amos from The Beekeeper
 "Witness", a song by Joan as Police Woman from The Classic
 "Witness", a song by Sarah McLachlan from Surfacing
 "Witness", a song by Bo Bice from See the Light
 "Witness", a song by Red Fang from Red Fang
 "Witness", a song by Jordan Feliz

Periodicals
 Witness (magazine), a magazine published by the Black Mountain Institute
 Witness (religious newspaper) edited by Hugh Miller in the mid nineteenth century
 The Witness (newspaper), a South African daily newspaper published in Pietermaritzburg

Plays
 Witness (play), a 1968 play by Terrence McNally
 Witness: Five Plays from the Gospel of Luke, a series of BBC Radio plays

Television
Series
 Witness (2006 TV programme), a documentary programme that airs on Al Jazeera English
 Witness (TV series), a Canadian documentary television series (1992–2004)
 The Witness (TV series), a 1960-61 television show broadcast on the CBS network
 Witnesses (TV series), a 2014 French television series (Les Témoins)

Episodes
 "Witness" (Better Call Saul), a 2017 episode of the American crime drama television series Better Call Saul "Witness" (Person of Interest), a 2011 episode of the American drama television series Person of Interest"Witness" (The Secret Circle), a 2012 episode of the American television series The Secret Circle "The Witness" (Queen of Swords), a 2000 episode of the TV series Queen of SwordsReligion
Witnessing or evangelism, a name for proselytising in Christianity
Jehovah's Witnesses, a restorationist Christian denomination whose name references the above

Other uses
 Witness (mathematics), a value τ for variable x with the property that φ(τ) is true, rendering the existential statement ∃x φ(x) true as well; τ is then said to be a witness for the statement ∃x φ(x)
 Witness, a number that plays a role in a primality testWitness'', a cast-iron sculpture by Antony Gormley
 Witness (altar), a monument in the Book of Joshua
 Witness (organization), a non-profit organization started by Peter Gabriel
 Witnesses, different documents of a single, original text in textual criticism

See also
 Eyewitness (disambiguation), various meanings
 Two witnesses
 Three Witnesses
 Eight Witnesses